The Executive Office is a devolved Northern Ireland government department in the Northern Ireland Executive with overall responsibility for the running of the Executive. The ministers with overall responsibility for the department are the First Minister and deputy First Minister.

The department was originally known as the Office of the First Minister and Deputy First Minister, with the same capitalisation used in the department's logo. Following a change in policy in 2007 (see First Minister and deputy First Minister), the word "deputy" was then spelt with a lower-case d, but the older version of the name was retained in the logo. In May 2016, the department was renamed the Executive Office as a result of the Fresh Start Agreement.

Ministers
Until 9 January 2017, the First Minister and deputy First Minister were Arlene Foster (Democratic Unionist Party) and Martin McGuinness (Sinn Féin) respectively. On 9 January 2017, McGuinness resigned, forcing the vacancy of Foster's position under the rules of the Assembly. On 11 January 2020, Arlene Foster was reappointed First Minister with Michelle O'Neill of Sinn Féin appointed deputy First Minister. 

They are assisted by two junior ministers: Gary Middleton (DUP) and Declan Kearney (Sinn Féin).

Responsibilities

The Executive Office's overall aim is to “deliver a peaceful, fair, equal and prosperous society". Its key stated objectives include: "driving investment and sustainable development"; "Tackling disadvantage and promoting equality of opportunity"; and the "effective operation of the institutions of government".

The office has the following main responsibilities:

 administrative support for the Northern Ireland Executive (co-chaired by the First Minister and Deputy First Minister)
 children and young people
 equality of opportunity and good relations
 emergency planning
 infrastructure investment
 international relations
 liaison with the Northern Ireland Assembly, the North/South Ministerial Council, the British-Irish Council, the Civic Forum for Northern Ireland (suspended) and departments of the UK Government
 poverty and social exclusion
 sustainable development
 victims and survivors of the Troubles

The Executive Office's main counterparts in the United Kingdom Government are:
 the Northern Ireland Office (oversees the devolution settlement);
 the Cabinet Office (on the machinery of government and honours);
 the Department for Communities and Local Government (on community relations and emergency planning);
 the Government Equalities Office;
 the Department for Environment, Food and Rural Affairs (on sustainable development);
 the Foreign and Commonwealth Office (on international relations).

History

A Prime Minister of Northern Ireland was appointed on its formation in June 1921, supported by the Department of the Prime Minister, but the office was abolished in March 1972, on suspension of the Parliament of Northern Ireland and introduction of direct rule.

The Northern Ireland (Temporary Provisions) Act 1972 transferred the powers of the Prime Minister to the Secretary of State for Northern Ireland within the British Government. A Chief Executive of Northern Ireland briefly held office in the 1974 Northern Ireland Executive.  The Secretary of State was supported by the Northern Ireland Office, which was responsible for security and political affairs during the Troubles.

Following a referendum on the Belfast Agreement on 23 May 1998 and the granting of royal assent to the Northern Ireland Act 1998 on 19 November 1998, a Northern Ireland Assembly and Northern Ireland Executive were established by the United Kingdom Government under Prime Minister Tony Blair. The process was known as devolution and was set up to return devolved legislative powers to Northern Ireland. OFMDFM was one of five new devolved Northern Ireland departments created in December 1999 by the Northern Ireland Act 1998 and The Departments (Northern Ireland) Order 1999.

The First Minister and Deputy First Minister first took office on 2 December 1999.  Devolution was suspended for four periods, during which the department came under the responsibility of direct rule ministers from the Northern Ireland Office:
 between 12 February 2000 and 30 May 2000;
 on 11 August 2001;
 on 22 September 2001;
 between 15 October 2002 and 8 May 2007.

See also
 First Minister and deputy First Minister
 Committee for the Executive Office
 Northern Ireland Bureau
 Office of the Northern Ireland Executive in Brussels
 Commissioner for Older People for Northern Ireland

References

External links
 Executive Office
 NIDirect

Northern Ireland Executive
1999 establishments in Northern Ireland